The Hengdang is a single edged sword with a long handle used by the Ahoms in India. The handle and the scabbard were designed in gold, silver or wood according to the position of the person. It is similar in many ways to the samurai sword or katana. Hengdang was used as a special kind of sword which was used by high ranking officials of the Ahom Kingdom like the King, Prime Minister, Commander and Sub-Commander. It has ceremonial use today in the Ahom wedding.

See also
 Dha (sword)
 Dao (Naga sword)
 Dao (Chinese sword)
 Chinese sword
 Turko-Mongol sabers
 Korean sword
 Japanese sword
 Indian sword

References

Textiles and clothing of Assam
South Asian swords
Indian swords